Kenneth B. Talton (born June 25, 1956) is a former American football running back who played for the Detroit Lions of the National Football League (NFL). He played college football at Cornell University, where he was a member of the Quill and Dagger society.

References 

Living people
1956 births
American football running backs
Cornell Big Red football players
Detroit Lions players